(May 5, 1949 – September 9, 1978) was a Japanese avant-garde alto saxophonist. Self-taught at a young age, Abe performed with notables such as Motoharu Yoshizawa, Takehisa Kosugi, Yosuke Yamashita, Derek Bailey, and Milford Graves,  although he generally performed solo. He was married to the author Izumi Suzuki, and was a cousin to singer Kyu Sakamoto. He was portrayed in Kōji Wakamatsu's film Endless Waltz by novelist and punk rock singer Kō Machida.

Personal life 
Abe dropped out of highschool in 1967, at 17 years of age, to focus on perfecting his playing, and in 1968, he did his first performance, at a jazz spot named Oreo. In 1970, he met Masayuki Takayanagi. in 1971, he met Izumi Suzuki, and in 1973, they married. In 1976, they had a daughter. However, in 1977, they divorced.

Career 
Abe was prolific, appearing almost every day to jazz spots and concerts. His library consists almost entirely of archival and live recordings, however he has recorded in a studio.

In his later years, Abe would begin playing different instruments. In 1976-1978 to be specific, were his years of most exploration. However, there have been instances of him playing harmonica in 1970-1971. He also played bass clarinet all the way throughout his career.

Death 
Abe died from Bromisoval overdose in 1978, causing an acute gastric perforation.

References

 Yuko Morita (ed.). Abe Kaoru march 1980. Tokyo: Bunyusha, 1994 (Japanese)
 Soejima Teruto. Nihon furii jazu shi (日本フリージャズ史, The History of Japanese Free Jazz). Tokyo: Seidosha, 2002 (Japanese)

External links
Kaoru Abe website, including an English discography
[ Abe profile on allmusic.com]
Izumi entry in The Encyclopedia of Science Fiction

1949 births
Japanese jazz saxophonists
Avant-garde saxophonists
Free jazz saxophonists
1978 deaths
People from Kawasaki, Kanagawa
DIW Records artists
P.S.F. Records artists
20th-century Japanese musicians
20th-century saxophonists
Drug-related deaths in Japan
NoBusiness Records artists